Mycetobia is a genus of wood gnats in the family Anisopodidae. There are more than 20 described species in Mycetobia.

Species
These 28 species belong to the genus Mycetobia:

Mycetobia asiatica Mamaev, 1987
Mycetobia bicolor Mamaev, 1971
Mycetobia divergens Walker, 1856
Mycetobia formosana Papp, 2007
Mycetobia fulva Philippi, 1865
Mycetobia gemella Mamaev, 1968
Mycetobia kunashirensis Mamaev, 1987
Mycetobia limanda Stone, 1966
Mycetobia morula Mamaev, 1987
Mycetobia neocaledonica Baylac & Matile, 1988
Mycetobia notabilis Mamaev, 1968
Mycetobia obscura Mamaev, 1968
Mycetobia pacifica Mamaev, 1987
Mycetobia pallipes Meigen, 1818
Mycetobia pilosa Mamaev, 1968
Mycetobia pseudogemella Mamaev, 1987
Mycetobia scutellaris Baylac & Matile, 1988
Mycetobia seguyi Baylac & Matile, 1990
Mycetobia stonei Lane & Andretta, 1958
Mycetobia thoracica Guerin-Meneville, 1835
Mycetobia tibialis Mamaev, 1987
Mycetobia turkmenica Mamaev, 1987
Mycetobia ulmicola Mamaev, 1971
Mycetobia xylogena Mamaev, 1987
†Mycetobia connexa Meunier, 1899
†Mycetobia longipennis Meunier, 1899
†Mycetobia platyuroides Meunier, 1899

References

Further reading

External links

 

Anisopodidae
Articles created by Qbugbot
Taxa named by Johann Wilhelm Meigen
Bibionomorpha genera